Goodenia durackiana is a species of flowering plant in the family Goodeniaceae and is endemic to north-western Australia. It is an erect to low-lying herb with elliptic to oblong stem leaves with coarse teeth on the edges, and racemes of yellow flowers.

Description
Flowering mostly occurs from March to May and the fruit is a more or less spherical capsule  in diameter.

Taxonomy and naming
Goodenia durackiana was first formally described in 1990 by Roger Charles Carolin in the journal Telopea from material collected by Michael Lazarides at the Kimberley Research Station in 1963. The specific epithet (durackiana) honours Kim Durack who collected specimens of this species in 1945.

Distribution and habitat
This goodenia grows in grasslands on black, cracking soils in the north-eastern Kimberley region of Western Australia and north-western Northern Territory.

Conservation status
Goodenia durackiana is classified as "Priority One" by the Government of Western Australia Department of Parks and Wildlife, meaning that it is known from only one or a few locations which are potentially at risk.

References

durackiana
Eudicots of Western Australia
Flora of the Northern Territory
Plants described in 1990
Taxa named by Roger Charles Carolin
Endemic flora of Australia